The Pioneer CLD-D703, or the CLD-D770 in non-North American marketplaces, was a part of Pioneer's 700 Series of upper mid-range LaserDisc players, and the first player in the family and top of Pioneer's 1994 North American line. On the grounds of picture and audio quality, the 703 is widely considered one of the best non-Elite LaserDisc players ever made by Pioneer. It evolved into the CLD-D704, which itself was the basis for the CLD-79 and CLD-99 Elite line of high-end models.

Information
Pioneer introduced the CLD-D703 to provide a "stop gap" model to fit in between the CLD-D503, a lower mid-range player, and the more expensive, prior models in their Elite lineup. Although lacking an AC-3 RF output for transmission of Dolby Digital sound, it did include many high-end features including a 51db video signal-to-noise ratio, 116db audio signal-to-noise ratio, quick Gamma-Turn side flip, Digital Field Memory (allowing for freeze frame and slow motion options on CLV discs), One Shot Memory (for displaying a frame as a background), coaxial and TOSLINK audio outputs, adjustable digital noise reduction, digital time base correction, twin 1-bit DLC digital-to-analog converters, and a backlit remote control with jog dial (CU-CLD098). This model is also a combi player, meaning it could also play Compact Disc and CD Video via an independent standard CD-sized tray. 

For 1995, Pioneer upgraded the player, adding the AC-3 RF output and rebadging it as the CLD-D704. Other than an AC-3 RF output, the player largely remained the same. However, the 703 can be modified with an aftermarket AC-3 RF circuit for Dolby Digital capability. The optical TOSLINK output provides the 703 with full DTS audio capability with LDs carrying such tracks to any DTS-equipped AV receiver or processor. The unit also possesses excellent, "sync-to-play" capability with older LDs bearing the LaserVision and DiscoVision label.

Pioneer used the CLD-D703/704 hardware for two "spin-off" Elite lineup players. First was the CLD-79, which was little more than a rebadged CLD-D704 with a high-gloss black "urushi" finish, different electroluminescent front panel placement, gold-plated RCA jacks, and slightly higher audio signal-to-noise ratio. The second, the CLD-99, was again only a minor evolution; in terms of hardware it was simply a CLD-79 but with an improved 3D comb filter that worked via the S-Video output to increase picture quality.

After the discontinuation of this model, the CLD-D704, CLD-79 and 99, Pioneer began abandoning LaserDisc in 1996 with the release of the DVD format set to debut the following year with the brand introducing several less-performance, more-ease of use geared DVD/LD combo players and a few prior, very basic LD models that were all that remained available for the North American consumer base.

LaserDisc
Pioneer Corporation products